Eulechria cocytias is a moth in the family Oecophoridae. It was described by Edward Meyrick in 1915. It is found in Australia, where it has been recorded from Queensland and Victoria.

References

Moths described in 1915
Oecophorinae